Baltasar Kormákur Baltasarsson (born 27 February 1966) is an Icelandic actor, theater and film director, and film producer. He is best known for directing the films 101 Reykjavík, The Sea, A Little Trip to Heaven, Contraband, 2 Guns, and Everest.

Life and career
Baltasar was born in Reykjavík, Iceland. His father is the Spanish painter Baltasar Samper. His son is actor Baltasar Breki Samper.

For his film Mýrin (Jar City), he won the Crystal Globe award at the Karlovy Vary International Film Festival in 2007. In December 2011, it was announced the production of a drama film Rocketman with Baltasar Kormákur and Dagur Kári was set to direct the film. His 2012 film The Deep was selected as the Icelandic entry for the Best Foreign Language Oscar at the 85th Academy Awards, making the January shortlist. In January 2013, it was again announced that the film will be produced by Baltasar with his partner Agnes Johansen. Denmark's Nimbus Film will co-produce the film. The film's production started in February and will be filmed until the end of 2013, with an expected release in 2015. In February 2015, it was announced that his next film would be the crime-thriller The Oath, which is based on a script by actor Ólafur Egilsson.

In 2020, Baltasar began production of the Netflix science fiction series Katla.

Filmography

Film

Producer only
 Pop in Reykjavík (1998) (Documentary)
 Stormy Weather (2003)
 Dís (2004)
 The Amazing Truth About Queen Raquela (2008) (Executive producer)
 Reykjavík-Rotterdam (2008)
 Summerland (2010)
 Virgin Mountain (2015)
 Vultures (2018)
 Against the Ice (2022)

Television

Acting credits

Awards and honors

See also
Blueeyes Productions

References

External links

Baltasar Kormákur at AllMovie

Baltasar Kormakur
Baltasar Kormakur
Living people
1966 births
Baltasar Kormakur
Baltasar Kormakur
Baltasar Kormakur
Baltasar Kormakur
Baltasar Kormakur
Baltasar Kormakur